Binz GmbH & Co. KG is a coachbuilder and custom vehicle manufacturer. It manufacturers ambulances, firetrucks, police cars and other emergency-service vehicles as well as modified military vehicles. It also produces other custom vehicles such as vehicles for the handicapped, limousines and hearses mainly on a Mercedes-Benz platform. It was founded in 1936 as coachbuilder Binz Lorch & Co by Michael Binz in Lorch, Germany. In the 1950s they also produced the Binz scooter.
In 2012 the RMA Group acquired the assets of Binz Ilmenau to continue its operation as BINZ Ambulance- und Umwelttechnik GmbH.

References

Emergency services equipment makers
German brands
Coachbuilders of Germany
Vehicle manufacturing companies established in 1936